Yūichi Sugita was the defending champion, but lost in the quarterfinals to Marco Chiudinelli.
Third Seed Mikhail Youzhny claimed his third ATP Challenger Tour title, beating Go Soeda 6–3, 6–4

Seeds

Draw

Finals

Top half

Bottom half

References
 Main Draw
 Qualifying Draw

Singles
KPN Bangkok Open - Singles
 in Thai tennis